Glenea lefebvrei is a species of beetle in the family Cerambycidae. It was described by Félix Édouard Guérin-Méneville in 1831, originally under the genus Saperda. It is known from Papua New Guinea and Indonesia.

Varieties
 Glenea lefebvrei var. submedia Thomson, 1860
 Glenea lefebvrei var. violaceipennis Breuning, 1950

References

lefebvrei
Beetles described in 1831